Congregation Gemiluth Chassodim known locally as "The Jewish Temple" is an historic Jewish synagogue located in Alexandria, Louisiana.  Founded in 1859 by Jews from the Alsace region of France, it is one of the oldest congregations in Louisiana and one of the original founding members of the Union of American Hebrew Congregations, now known as the Union for Reform Judaism.

History
Congregation Gemiluth Chassodim was originally established as the Hebrew Benevolent Society of Rapides Parish in 1852 in order to provide a Jewish Cemetery for burials. One belief for this is that certain families bought a burial ground when a small outbreak of yellow fever claimed six Jewish lives in the early 1850s. Eventually, the society evolved into a congregation in 1859. The first President of the Temple was Isaac Levy.

In 1860, the Jewish women of Alexandria assembled to found the Ladies' Hebrew Benevolent Society in order to raise money to buy real estate on which a temple could be built. The Ladies Hebrew Benevolent Society eventually changed its name to the Temple Sisterhood. In 1869, the Temple Sisterhood held a fundraising ball to raise money to build a synagogue at the corner of Third and Fiske Streets. Construction of the temple concluded in 1871. Two years later the congregation joined the Union of American Hebrew Congregations (now URJ) and hired Rabbi Marx Klein as its first rabbi. 

Gemiluth Chassodim experienced great increase in its membership, from 123 families in 1925, to 154 families in 1930 and 203 families in 1945. The "Second Temple," which stood as an imposing Greek Revival structure (more than three stories tall) with a dome burned in 1956. The congregation had already constructed its current Mid-Century modern structure on Turner Street in the early 1950s. Designed by Max Heinberg, it stands as a unique example of Mid-Century modern architecture even to this day. In the early 1960s, the current sanctuary, offices, and classrooms were added. The sanctuary is capable of holding some 350 people at maximum capacity.  

Thirty-four presidents and 25 rabbis have served the temple. In 2013, Rabbi Harley Karz-Wagman became the twenty-fifth rabbi of the Temple after leaving Mt. Sinai Synagogue in Cheyenne, Wyoming. In 2016, Rabbi Peter Schaktman served the congregation.

The congregation hired its first female clergy member since its founding in 1859, Rabbi Cantor Raina Siroty in 2017.

Today
Congregation Gemiluth Chassodim remains an active part of the Greater Alexandria community. It serves as a regional synagogue drawing in members from such neighboring communities as: Natchitoches, Leesville, Natchez, Winnfield, and Fort Polk. Its current membership consists of approximately 120 member families with a religious school of 30 students. Its previous two rabbis, Martin Hinchin and Arnold Task served a combined 52 years in their service to the congregation. 

Shabbat services are held weekly on Friday evenings and Saturday mornings. The Temple actively hosts numerous guest speakers, concerts, and cultural events for the Jewish and non-Jewish communities of Alexandria.

Rabbis
Below is a listing of the rabbis who have served the congregation since 1873:

Marx Klein 1873–1879
M. Weinstein 1881–1882
Abraham Meyer 1882–1884
H. Joseph M. Chumaceiro 1884–1885
Israel Heinberg 1888–1889
Hyman Saft 1889–1891
Louis Schreiber 1892–1895
Alex Rosenspitz 1895–1901
Emile Ellinger 1901–1905
Herman J. Elkin 1905–1907
Leonard J. Rothstein 1907–1918
Harry Weiss 1919–1920
Myron M. Meyer 1921–1926
H. Cerf Strauss 1927–1930
Albert G. Baum 1930–1942
Abraham Shinedling 1943–1944
H. Bruce Ehrmann 1946–1947
Mordecai M. Thurman 1947–1951
Robert J. Schur 1952–1956
Joel C. Dobin 1957
Martin I. Hinchin 1958–1988
James L. Kessler 1988–1989
Arnold S. Task 1989–2011
Harley Karz-Wagman 2013-2016
Peter Schaktman  2016-17
 Raina Siroty 2017-

Notable members
Sylvan Friedman, politician
Arnold Jack Rosenthal, politician

Gallery

See also
B'nai Israel Traditional Synagogue

References

External links

Alsatian-Jewish culture in the United States
Ashkenazi synagogues
French-American culture in Louisiana
German-American culture in Louisiana
Founding members of the Union for Reform Judaism
Buildings and structures in Alexandria, Louisiana
Reform synagogues in Louisiana
Synagogues completed in 1952
Religious organizations established in 1859
1859 establishments in the United States
Modernist architecture in Louisiana